Oroya is a genus of cacti (family Cactaceae), originating from Peru.

The name comes from the Peruvian town of la Oroya where the first plants were discovered.

Oroya species are solitary with a globular form and many ribs with usually-dense pectinate spines.

Small flowers (up to 1 cm in diameter) grow along a ring near the top of the plant. The flowers are yellow, but their stems are often pink or red.

Species

References and external links

External links
 Cactiguide.com: photos of Oroya

Trichocereeae
Cacti of South America
Endemic flora of Peru
Cactoideae genera